Lorenzo Aragón Armenteros (born April 28, 1974) is a former amateur boxer from Cuba, who was a two-time world champion in the welterweight category.

Amateur career
Aragón took up boxing at the age of 12. In 1991, a 17-year old Aragón won a bronze medal in Playa Girón, Cuba's national amateur boxing tournament. Aragón became the youngest boxer to ever medal in that competition. In 1992, Aragón would go on to win the tournament win the flyweight gold medal in the AIBA Youth World Boxing Championships 1992. He competed at the 1996 Olympics as a featherweight, losing in the quarterfinals to Floyd Mayweather. Aragón got a flash knockdown over Mayweather but he'd lose by a single point.

Between 1992 and 2004, Aragón won the Playa Girón tournament 10 times across 6 different weight classes, defeating boxers like Mario Kindelan, Arnaldo Mesa, and Erislandy Lara.> Aragón would eventually settle in the welterweight division, where he won several international competitions.

Aragón won the 2001 World Championships at welterweight, beating Anthony Thompson in the final.  He repeated his win in 2003 defeating Andre Berto in the semifinals and Sherzod Husanov in the final bout. Aragón was also the 2003 Pan American Games champion in the same division.

At the 2004 Summer Olympics he won the silver medal. He beat Vanes Martirosyan in the semifinals. In the final, Aragón was upset by surprise winner Bakhtiyar Artayev with a score of 36-26. Prior to the Athens Games he won the 2004 Acropolis Boxing Cup in Athens, Greece by defeating Ruslan Khairov in the final of the welterweight division.

Olympic results 
1996 (Featherweight)
Defeated Nouzedinne Medjihoud (Algeria) 9-6
Defeated Rogerio de Brito (Brazil) 16-6
Lost to Floyd Mayweather Jr. (United States) 11-12

2004 (Welterweight)
Defeated Theodoros Kotakos (Greece) RSC-3 (1:29)
Defeated Vanes Martirosyan (United States) 20-11
Defeated Ruslan Khairov (Azerbaijan) 16-14
Defeated Kim Jung-Joo (South Korea) 38-10
Lost to Bakhtiyar Artayev (Kazakhstan) 36-26

World championship results

2001
Defeated Ryan Savage (Canada) RSC 3
Defeated Bae Ho-Jo (South Korea) RSC 3
Defeated Timour Gaidalov (Russia) 27-15
Defeated Sherzod Husanov (Uzbekistan) RSC 2
Defeated Anthony Thompson (United States) 27-15

2003
Defeated Vilmos Balog (Hungary) 23-8
Defeated Bulent Ulusoy (Turkey) 18-17
Defeated Spas Genov (Bulgaria) 24-15
Defeated Non Boonjumnong (Thailand) RSC 2
Defeated Andre Berto (United States) 25-15
Defeated Sherzod Husanov uzb.,17:9

Other amateur highlights 
1992 Cuban amateur flyweight champion
1992 Under-19 flyweight world champion.
1994 Cuban amateur bantamweight champion
1994 Pan-American bantamweight champion
1995 Cuban amateur lightweight champion
1996 Cuban amateur featherweight champion
1997 Cuban amateur lightweight champion
1998 Cuban amateur Light welterweight champion
1999 Cuban amateur welterweight champion
2001 Cuban amateur welterweight champion
2003 Cuban amateur welterweight champion
2003 gold medalist at Pan-American Games in Santo Domingo, Dominican Republic. Results were:
Defeated Fabián Leonardo Velardes (Argentina) 23-4
Defeated Euris Gonzalez (Dominican Republic) 25-4
Defeated Juan McPherson (United States) 30-11
2004 Cuban amateur welterweight champion

References

External links

1974 births
Living people
Welterweight boxers
Boxers at the 1996 Summer Olympics
Boxers at the 2003 Pan American Games
Boxers at the 2004 Summer Olympics
Olympic boxers of Cuba
Olympic silver medalists for Cuba
Olympic medalists in boxing
Cuban male boxers
AIBA World Boxing Championships medalists
Medalists at the 2004 Summer Olympics
Pan American Games gold medalists for Cuba
Pan American Games medalists in boxing
People from Cienfuegos Province
Medalists at the 2003 Pan American Games